Erigeron pseudotenuicaulis is a Chinese species of flowering plants in the family Asteraceae. It grows on hillsides in the province of Sichuan in southwestern China.

Erigeron pseudotenuicaulis is a perennial herb up to 25 cm (10 inches) tall, forming a woody rhizomes. Its flower heads have red ray florets surrounding yellow disc florets.

References

pseudotenuicaulis
Flora of Sichuan
Plants described in 1973